Eva B is a Pakistani hip hop rapper and singer. She comes from a Baloch family, and writes and sings in Balochi and Urdu. She is known for her appearance on the music television series Coke Studio in 2022 with her song "Kana Yaari".

Career 
According to Eva B, she started her journey in 2014, after being inspired by Eminem. Just after the start of her career, she was not allowed to continue music due to family pressures. She restarted her career in 2019, with her song "Gully Girl" (girl's power) at Pakistani music streaming platform Patari. After "Gully Girl" Eva B sang under the condition that she keep her face veiled. She says, "I am comfortable with the veil and it's my identity. My brother is no longer uncomfortable with my music".

She sang on the YouTube channel with small-scale productions. Her songs "Mukhtasir Batain", "Quarantine Aunti", Qalam Bolega (The Pen Shall Speak), and "Khusnawees" were released in 2020. She collaborated with a few notable singers. She sang a duet with other Pakistani singers in 2021 including "Tera Jism Meri Marzi" (your body my will) with Ali Gul Pir, "Anjanni Rahon Pe" (traveling on unexplored ways) with Muhammad Baloch, and "Flex your Moves" with Anas Baloch.

Following her initial successes, her major breakthrough came when was contacted by Zulfiqar Jabbar Khan, director of Coke Studio 14, in which she sung the song "Kana Yaari".

Her song "Rozi" was featured in the closing credits of  Ms. Marvel  episode 1, 'Generation Why'.

Name 
According to Eva B, "Eva" is a tribute to the first woman on Earth, Eve. Like the latter, she is among the first women rappers in Pakistan. In a 2021 interview, she explained that the added letter 'B' is a nod to her Baloch identity.

References 

Year of birth missing (living people)
Living people
21st-century women rappers
Balochi-language singers
Pakistani rappers
Urdu-language singers